General Saber Sangar was born in Parwan Province Afghanistan. An Afghan political and military leader. He was a powerful military commander during the President Najibullah government. When he was 23 years old, he was a battalion (kandak) commander of Afghan Army in Parwan province consisting of 450 troops, he known as younger battalion commander in that time. In President Najibullah government was chief of Parwan province KHAD, then he was Deputy chief of Afghanistan State Intelligence Agency.

References

External links
 http://www.usinfo.ru/afgan7.htm

1953 births
Living people
Parwan Province
Afghan politicians